Parull Chaudhry is an Indian television series, film actress and YouTuber. She is recognized for her television serials such as Ek Tha Raja Ek Thi Rani, Divya Drishti,  Tere Mere Sapne, Savdhaan India, Piyaa Albela.

Career

Chaudhry began her career with the Star One horror-thriller serial Ssshhhh...Koi Hai. She starred in the television drama serial Tere Mere Sapne as Kayma in 2009. The story concentrates on the question of migration from rural to the dream city, Mumbai. She appeared in the crime-drama show Adaalat played various roles like Pranali Jagasia, Pranali Anurag Rastogi, and Sylvia Fernandes from 2010 to 2014. In 2015, she was cast in the drama-romance serial Ek Tha Raja Ek Thi Rani, playing the role of Kunwarani Kokila Chandravadan Singh Deo.

Chaudhry next appeared as Neelima Vyas in the television serial Piyaa Albela in the year 2019. She was also a part of the fantasy show Divya Drishti and the drama series Kasautii Zindagii Kay as Rakhi Basu.

Filmography

Television 
 Star One's Ssshhhh...Phir Koi Hai
Zee TV's Aaj Ki Housewife Hai... Sab Jaanti Hai
Star Plus's Baa Bahoo Aur Baby
Sahara One's Haunted Nights, & Kuch Apne Kuch Paraye
Sony SAB's  Left Right Left
Sony TV's Crime Patrol, Bhoot Aaya, Adaalat & Bhanwar
Zee TV's Aaj Ki Housewife Hai... Sab Jaanti Hai, Ek Tha Raja Ek Thi Rani as Kunwarani Kokila Chandravadan Singh Deo
Life OK's SuperCops vs Supervillains & Devon Ke Dev...Mahadev
Star Plus's Tere Mere Sapne
Zee Tv's Piya Albela as Neelima Vyas
Star Plus's Phir Bhi Na Maane...Badtameez Dil
Sony Pal's Tum Saath Ho Jab Apne as Nazima Yunuis Baig 
Zee TV's Ek Tha Raja Ek Thi Rani 
Zee TV's Piya Albela
Star Plus's Divya-Drishti as Ashlesha "Ash" Shergill
Star Plus's Kasautii Zindagii Kay as Rakhi Basu
Star Plus's Anupamaa as Dr. Mona Chopra
Zee TV's Bhagya Lakshmi as Karishma Oberoi

Films 
 Apna Aasmam in 2007
 Apartment in 2010 
 Accident on hill road in 2009
 Dabur Vatika Brave and Beautiful in 2014
 Short Film - Watermelon in 2015
 The Last Koan (festival film) in 2019

References

External links 
 
 

Living people
Indian television actresses
Actresses from Mumbai
Year of birth missing (living people)
People from New Delhi